The 2017 season is Bethlehem Steel FC's second season of competitive soccer in the United Soccer League and first season competing in the second division of American soccer. Steel FC compete in the league's Eastern Conference.

Current roster

Transfers

In

Out

Loan in

Competitions

Bethlehem Steel FC compete in USL, which is the second tier of the American soccer pyramid. Steel FC's affiliation with the Philadelphia Union of MLS has prevented the team from participating in the U.S. Open Cup competition. The decision to make affiliated "farm teams" ineligible for the U.S. Open Cup was decided since the 2016 iteration of the tournament.

Preseason

USL regular season 

The 2017 USL season will be contested by 30 teams, 15 of which compete in the league's Eastern Conference. All teams will play a regular season total of 32 matches between teams within their respective conference. At the conclusion of the regular season, the top eight teams from each conference advance to the 2017 USL Playoffs for a chance to compete for the USL Championship Title.

Standings (Eastern Conference)

Results 

All times in Eastern Time.

Results summary

USL Playoffs 
Bethlehem Steel FC earned the final playoff spot during the 2017 USL season for the first time in the club's history. Finishing as the 8th seed, Steel FC's first round fixture was away at conference winning Louisville City FC.

All times in Eastern Time.

Statistics 
As of October 28, 2017.

Goalkeepers 
As of October 28, 2017.

Players with names in italics were on loan from Philadelphia Union for individual matches with Bethlehem.
Players with names marked ‡ were academy call-ups from Philadelphia Union Academy for individual matches with Bethlehem.
Players with names marked * were on loan from another club for the whole of their season with Bethlehem.
Players with names marked † were transferred/released from the club midseason.
League denotes USL regular season
Playoffs denotes USL Playoffs

Honors 
 Week 3 Player of the Week: F Seku Conneh Honorable Mention: M Santi Moar
 Week 6 Team of the Week: D Hugh Roberts
 Week 8 Team of the Week: G Jake McGuire
 Week 9 Save of the Week: G Jake McGuire
 Week 10 Team of the Week Honorable Mention: F Cory Burke
 Week 11 Team of the Week Honorable Mention: F Seku Conneh
 Week 12 Team of the Week Honorable Mention: F Seku Conneh
 Week 13 Player of the Week: M Adam Najem Honorable Mention: D Auston Trusty
 Week 15 Team of the Week Honorable Mention: D Aaron Jones
 Week 20 Team of the Week: M Chris Nanco
 Week 21 Team of the Week Honorable Mention: F Cory Burke
 Week 24 Team of the Week Honorable Mention: M Marcus Epps
 Week 27 Team of the Week: F Cory Burke
 Week 28 Team of the Week Honorable Mention: F Seku Conneh
 Week 29 Team of the Week: M Santi Moar

References 

Bethlehem Steel FC
Bethlehem Steel FC
Philadelphia Union II seasons
Bethlehem Steel FC